Wabigoon is an unincorporated community in the Canadian province of Ontario, located in the Kenora District.

The community is located on Highway 17, approximately 20 kilometres east of Dryden and seven kilometres west of Dinorwic.

A designated place served by a local services board, Wabigoon had a population of 417 in the Canada 2006 Census.

Demographics 

References 

Communities in Kenora District
Designated places in Ontario
Local services boards in Ontario